Uriel Lubrani (October 7, 1926 – March 5, 2018) was an Israeli diplomat and military official. In 1964, he joined the diplomatic corps of the Foreign Ministry, and was appointed ambassador to Uganda and non-resident ambassador to Burundi and Rwanda, serving until 1967. From 1967 to 1971, he was ambassador to Ethiopia.

From 1973 to 1978, he was head of the Israeli diplomatic mission in Iran, with the rank of ambassador.

Biography
Uri Lubrani was born in Haifa. He was the only son of Aaron and Rose Lubrani. He attended the Hebrew Reali School.

In 1944, he joined the Haganah, and served in the Palmach. He assisted in Aliyah Bet operations to smuggle illegal Jewish immigrants into Palestine, and in 1946, was sent to southern France to command a Haganah training camp for volunteers from English-speaking countries willing to fight for the Jewish cause. He returned with one such group to fight in the 1948 Arab-Israeli War, in which he served as an intelligence officer in the 7th Armored Brigade and Yiftach Brigade of the Israel Defense Forces. Lubrani died on March 5, 2018, from natural causes in Tel Aviv at the age of 91.

Diplomatic career
After the war ended, Lubrani joined the Middle East Department of the Israeli Foreign Ministry, and in 1950 became secretary and bureau head for Foreign Minister Moshe Sharet. Between 1953 and 1956, he studied at London University, and earned a BA. After returning to Israel in 1956, he was appointed Deputy Adviser on Arab Affairs for Prime Minister David Ben-Gurion. In this role, he was dedicated to development in Arab villages and recruiting Druze into military service. He then served as Bureau Manager and Secretary of Policy for Prime Minister Levi Eshkol.

In 1964, he joined the diplomatic corps of the Foreign Ministry, and was appointed ambassador to Uganda and non-resident ambassador to Burundi and Rwanda, serving until 1967. From 1967 to 1971, he was ambassador to Ethiopia. He then served as director of the state-owned Koor Industries Ltd. From 1973 to 1978, he was head of the Israeli diplomatic mission in Iran, with the rank of ambassador.

From 1979 to 1983, he worked in the private sector. In 1983, during the Israeli occupation of southern Lebanon after the 1982 Lebanon War, Lubrani was the governor (coordinator) of the activities of Israeli forces in Lebanon.

In September 1990, Lubrani was a coordinator in Ethiopia, assisting with Operation Solomon, the evacuation of Ethiopian Jews to Israel. He was a member of the Israeli delegation in Geneva to negotiate a prisoner exchange with Hezbollah. In 1992, headed the Israeli delegation to Lebanon in the wake of the Madrid Conference in Washington, DC.

Lubrani continued to serve as a consultant to the Minister of Defense and coordinator for government operations in Lebanon. After the Israeli withdrawal from southern Lebanon, he continued to serve as a consultant for the Ministry of Defense, then for the Ministry of Strategic Affairs. He was a consultant until 2010. In December 2017, Lubrani called for the "overthrow" of the Iranian regime to stop their nuclear program.

His daughter, Osnat Lubrani became the UN Humanitarian Coordinator in Ukraine in 2018. Prior to her service there, she was the Resident Coordinator for the Pacific. She has held conflict resolution posts with the United Nations in Kosovo and human rights and development positions in Zaire.

References

1926 births
2018 deaths
Ambassadors of Israel to Uganda
Ambassadors of Israel to Burundi
Ambassadors of Israel to Rwanda
Ambassadors of Israel to Ethiopia
Ambassadors of Israel to Iran
People from Haifa
Hebrew Reali School alumni
Alumni of the University of London
Palmach members